Fritz Cronin (1905-1969) played for the Duluth Eskimos of the National Football League.

Biography
Cronin was born on June 20, 1905, in Lake City, Minnesota. He attended high school in Kenosha, Wisconsin. Cronin died in March 1969 in Manchester, New Hampshire.

Career
Cronin was a member of the Eskimos during the 1927 NFL season. He played at the collegiate level at Saint Mary's College.

References

People from Lake City, Minnesota
Sportspeople from Kenosha, Wisconsin
Players of American football from Minnesota
Players of American football from Wisconsin
Duluth Eskimos players
Saint Mary's Redmen football players
American football ends
1905 births
1969 deaths